The Kuang Si Falls or Kuang Xi Falls, alternatively known as the Tat Kuang Si Waterfalls, is a three-tiered waterfall about  south of Luang Prabang. The waterfalls are a favorite side trip for tourists in Luang Prabang, and begin in shallow pools atop a steep hillside.

They are accessed via a trail to a left of the falls. The water flows into a turquoise blue pool before continuing downstream. The many cascades of Kuang Si are not typical of waterfalls, adding to the attractiveness.

The locals charge a nominal admission fee of 25,000 kip to visit the site, which is well maintained with walkways and bridges to guide the visitor. Most of the pools are open to swimming (although at least one is closed as being a sacred site).

Gallery

References

External links

 Travel adventures.org
 Kuang Si Falls: Photo and Travel Guide

Waterfalls of Laos
Geography of Luang Prabang province
Tourist attractions in Laos